Look Mom No Head!  is the fifth studio album and the 10th album overall by the American rock band the Cramps. It was released in November 1991 by Restless/Enigma, and licensed to Ace Records under Big Beat in the UK. It was recorded and mixed by Steve McMillan at Ocean Way Studios in Hollywood between June 21 and July 14, 1991. It was self-produced by Cramps guitarist Poison Ivy. Iggy Pop guested on the track "Miniskirt Blues", which was originally recorded by the Flower Children in 1967.

The Cramps reissued the album on their own Vengeance Records in 2001. The reissue contained two bonus tracks: "Wilder Wilder Faster Faster" and "Jelly Roll Rock".

Track listing

Personnel
The Cramps
Lux Interior - vocals
Poison Ivy Rorschach - guitar
Slim Chance - bass guitar
Jim Sclavunos - drums
with:
Iggy Pop - vocals on "Miniskirt Blues"
Technical
Steve Macmillan - recording, mixing
Lux Interior - cover design, photography

Notes and references

1991 albums
The Cramps albums